MacGregor Park/Martin Luther King Jr. is a light rail station in Houston, Texas on the METRORail system. It is served by the Purple Line, and is located in the median of Martin Luther King Jr. Boulevard at Old Spanish Trail near MacGregor Park.

MacGregor Park/Martin Luther King Jr. station opened on May 23, 2015.

References

METRORail stations
Railway stations in the United States opened in 2015
2015 establishments in Texas
Railway stations in Harris County, Texas